Two ships of the United States Navy have been named Cohoes after the city of Cohoes, New York.

  was a light draft monitor.
  was a net laying ship launched 29 November 1944 by the Commercial Iron Works, in Portland, Oregon.

Sources

United States Navy ship names